The 2014 AMA National Speedway Championship Series was staged over four rounds, which were held at Costa Mesa (June 7), Ventura (June 28), Industry (August 9) and Auburn (September 19). Billy Janniro took the title, his fifth in total, winning all four rounds.

Event format 
Over the course of 20 heats, each rider raced against every other rider once. The top eight scorers then reached the semi-finals, with first and second in those semi-finals reaching the final. Points were scored for every ride taken, including the semi-finals and final.

Classification

References 

AMA
United States
Speed
Speed
AMA National Speedway Championship
AMA National Speedway Championship
AMA National Speedway Championship